is a 6-episode Japanese original net animation, produced as a collaboration between Toshiba and the city of Kawasaki, Kanagawa. The first episode was streamed via YouTube on December 19, 2013.

Characters

References

External links
 

2013 anime ONAs